Carol Kolb is an American comedy writer. She was a writer for and editor-in-chief of The Onion, and a former head writer for the Onion News Network. She served as a writer on Kroll Show, and later worked as a staff writer on the television series Community, Review, and Brooklyn Nine-Nine.

Kolb was the founder of the now defunct Madison Museum of Bathroom Tissue.

References 

American comedy writers
American television writers
The Onion people
Year of birth missing (living people)
Living people
Place of birth missing (living people)
American women television writers
People from Spencer, Wisconsin
Screenwriters from Wisconsin
21st-century American women